Animal breeding is a branch of animal science that addresses the evaluation (using best linear unbiased prediction and other methods) of the genetic value (estimated breeding value, EBV) of livestock. Selecting for breeding animals with superior EBV in growth rate, egg, meat, milk, or wool production, or with other desirable traits has revolutionized livestock production throughout the entire world. The scientific theory of animal breeding incorporates population genetics, quantitative genetics, statistics, and recently molecular genetics and is based on the pioneering work of Sewall Wright, Jay Lush, and Charles Henderson.

Breeding stock
Breeding stock is a group of animals used for the purpose of planned breeding. When individuals are looking to breed animals, they look for certain valuable traits in purebred animals, or may intend to use some type of crossbreeding to produce a new type of stock with different, and presumably super abilities in a given area of endeavor. For example, when breeding swine for meat, the "breeding stock should be sound, fast growing, muscular, lean, and reproductively efficient." The "subjective selection of breeding stock" in horses has led to many horse breeds with particular performance traits. While breeding animals is common in an agricultural setting, it is also a common practice for the purpose of selling animals meant as pets, such as cats, dogs, horses, and birds, as well as less common animals, such as reptiles or some primates.

Purebred breeding 
	
Mating animals of the same breed for maintaining such breed is referred to as purebred breeding. Opposite to the practice of mating animals of different breeds, purebred breeding aims to establish and maintain stable traits, that animals will pass to the next generation. By "breeding the best to the best", employing a certain degree of inbreeding, considerable culling, and selection for "superior" qualities, one could develop a bloodline or "breed" superior in certain respects to the original base stock.

Such animals can be recorded with a breed registry, the organisation that maintains pedigrees and/or stud books.
The observable phenomenon of hybrid vigor stands in contrast to the notion of breed purity.

For laboratory purposes, organisms such as mice have been inbred to 100% pure lines, as offered for sale by the Jackson laboratory. But this is highly unusual and difficult to do for most organisms, in whose populations all individuals harbor recessive, deleterious gene variants (alleles).

Backyard breeding 
	
In the United States, a backyard breeder is someone who breeds animals, often without registration and with a focus on profit. In some cases, the animals are inbred narrowly for looks, with little regard to health. The term is considered derogatory.  If a backyard dog breeder has a significant number of breeding animals, they become associated with puppy mills. Most puppy mills are licensed with the USDA.

See also
Animal husbandry

Plant and animal breeding
 Artificial insemination of livestock and pets
 Artificial selection
 Agricultural science
 Backyard breeder
 Genomics of domestication
 Plant breeding
 Progeny testing
 Selective breeding

People
 Robert Bakewell
 Arthur B. Chapman
 James Hutton
 Thomas Lecky

Other topics
 BLUPF90 and ASReml: software packages for animal breeding statistics
 Veterinary medicine
 Veterinary surgeon
 Veterinarian

Further reading

 
 
 
 
 
 
 
 
 
 
 
 FAO. (2007). The Global Plan of Action for Animal Genetic Resources and the Interlaken  Declaration. Rome.
FAO. (2010). Breeding strategies for sustainable management of animal genetic resources.  FAO Animal Production and Health Guidelines. No. 3. Rome.
FAO. (2015). The Second Report on the State of the World's Animal Genetic Resources for  Food and Agriculture. Rome.

References

External links
 Domestic Animal Diversity Information System
 
 Implementing the Global Plan of Action for Animal Genetic Resources

Academic centers

Journals

Organizations
 
 
 
 
  
  
 

 
Livestock